Juergen Staack (born in Doberlug-Kirchhain in 1978) is a German minimalist and conceptual artist based in Düsseldorf.

Training and background 
After completing high school, Juergen Staack trained as a photographer. He subsequently attended Kunstakademie Düsseldorf from 2002 to 2008 where he studied with Thomas Ruff and Christopher Williams. In 2003, while still a student, he founded the artist group FEHLSTELLE along with other students.

Work 
Staack developed his own forms of expression in conceptual photography very early in his career, both questioning the translatability of photography to language as well as the “material fragility of the analog photograph and, in its fleeting quality, the digital photograph as well.” Towards this end, he uses various media such as performance, sound, video, sculpture, and photography and frequently makes the beholder a constitutive component of the artwork itself. Recurring themes in Staack’s work include the relationship between the image and its reproduction as well as its authenticity and origin, which he repeatedly questions. “His drawings, sound installations, speaking images, and poetic performances,” as the journalist Helga Meister laconically comments, “demonstrate the limits of visual representation.” Meanwhile, Peter Friese, former director of Bremen’s Museum Weserburg, concludes: In his artistic work, Staack is not only interested in the questions of What an image is? What constitutes an image? How, when, and where does it emerge? But also: what is the importance of an image in a world shaped by visual stimuli? He finds his terrain as a conceptual artist precisely in the image’s controversial claim to truth and the mass saturation of our world with ever more advanced media of communication. Results of this research are in part surprising investigations that are critical of the image and the media. Staack here moves in the liminal areas of photography and, with a critical gaze that questions contexts, examines the social-anchored use of images with information that crosses various media, with language and text.For Staack, unexpected processes of transformation and translation play a special role in a literal and metaphorical sense. Using illegible codes or news items that dissolve, his works unsettle classical structures of communication, sometimes taking them to absurd lengths. In so doing, they demonstrate “not only gaps between perception and communication, but also the limits of visual representation. In the age of an all dominating global visual culture,” according to art historian Sabine Maria Schmidt, "Juergen Staack poses the question of the foundations and elements that generate images in an entirely new way.”

Exhibitions

Solo exhibitions (selection) 

 2006: Left Behind, … Missing Pictures, Gallery Space Other, Boston
 2010: Transformation, Galerie Konrad Fischer, Düsseldorf
 2013: SAKHA, Galerie Konrad Fischer, Berlin
 2013: Script, artothek – Raum für Junge Kunst, Cologne
 2014: Zwei, Galerie Konrad Fischer, Düsseldorf
 2016: Reduktion der Wirklichkeit, Kunstverein Oldenburg, Oldenburg
 2016: DISPUT, Kunstverein Ruhr, Essen
 2020: Hans-Peter Feldmann, Thomas Ruff, Juergen Staack, Galerie Konrad Fischer, Düsseldorf

Group exhibitions (selection) 

 2004: realismus update, Jacobi Haus Künstlerverein Malkasten, Düsseldorf
 2005: Rencontre des Arles, Arles
 2009: FEHLSTELLE – LA ZONA, Public Space, Milan
 2010: Aber Schwarz ist keine Farbe, Galerie Konrad Fischer, Düsseldorf
 2011: ars viva – 2011/12, Museum Folkwang, Essen; Riga Art Space, Riga; Museum Weserburg, Bremen
 2011: Hantmann Staack, Kunstraum, Düsseldorf
 2012: Renania Libre, Gallery Helga de Alvear, Madrid
 2013: Transfer, MMCA, National Museum for Contemporary Art, Seoul; Museum Osthaus, Hagen
 2015: AAA – Art and the City, Zurich
 2015: More Konzeption – Conception now, Museum Morsbroich, Leverkusen
 2015: daily sounds around, Weltkunstzimmer, Düsseldorf
 2016: Offenes Depot, Kunsthaus NRW Kornelimünster, Aachen
 2017: Duett mit KünstlerIn, Museum Morsbroich, Leverkusen
 2017: Luther und die Avantgarde, Altes Gefängnis, Wittenberg
 2017: asphalt – Kunststörer, Alte Kämmerei, Düsseldorf
 2017: Mit den Händen zu greifen und doch nicht zu fassen, Kunsthalle Mainz, Mainz
 2017: Stress Field, Fine Arts Literature Art Center, Wuhan
 2017: Duett mit KünstlerIn, Belvedere 21, Vienna
 2018: Deutschland ist keine Insel, Bundeskunsthalle, Bonn
 2018: büro komplex, Kunsthaus NRW, Aachen
 2019: Listen to the image, look at the sound, Kai10 – Arthena Foundation, Düsseldorf

Works in collections 
 Bundeskunstsammlung (Sammlung zeitgenössischer Kunst der Bundesrepublik Deutschland)
 Sammlung Museum Folkwang
 Fördersammlung NRW
 Sammlung des Kunstpalastes
 Sammlung Wemhöhner
 Sammlung Philara

Prizes, residencies, fellowships

Prizes 

 2011: Förderpreis der Stadt Düsseldorf für Bildende Kunst
 2011: ars viva-Preis für Bildende Kunst
 2012: NEW POSITIONS (Art Cologne)

Fellowships 

 2009: Artist in residence, Tokyo Wonder Site
 2009: Kunststiftung NRW, project funding, Transcription-Image (die Sprache der Ainu)
 2012: Kunststiftung NRW, project funding, Eisflüstern
 2012: Artist in residence, Changdong Seoul (TRANSFER NRW–Korea), South Korea
 2013: Artist in residence, Art Space Estemp, Sao Paulo
 2015: Stiftung Kunstfonds (fellowship)
 2015: Artist in Residence, Hongcheon (Pink Factory), South Korea
 2020: Stiftung Kunstfonds, project funding, 7 Rooms of Life
 2020: Stiftung Kunstfonds, project funding, Unser-Deutsch auf Papua Neu-Guinea

Bibliography 

 “Deutschland ist keine Insel” Sammlung zeitgenössischer Kunst der Bundesrepublik Deutschland. Ankäufe von 2012 bis 2016 (Cologne: Kunst- und Ausstellungshalle der Bundesrepublik Deutschland and Wienand Verlag, 2018).
 Reduktion der Wirklichkeit. Juergen Staack (Oldenburg: Oldenburger Kunstverein, 2017).
 4th Documentary Exhibition of Fine Arts: Stress Field (Wuhan: Hubei Museum of Art & Fine Arts Literature Art Center, 2017).
 ars viva 2011/2012 – Sprache/Language: Erik Bünger, Philipp Goldbach, Juergen Staack, ed. Kulturkreis der deutschen Wirtschaft im BDI e. V. (Ostfildern: Hatje Cantz Verlag, 2012, .
 Estemp(orary). Fünf Ausstellungen im “Off-Raum” (Düsseldorf, 2010), .

See also 

 Website, Juergen Staack
 Literature by/on Juergen Staack, catalogue, Deutsche Nationalbibliothek
 Juergen Staack, Portrait (NRW Landesbüros), Vimeo
 Düsseldorfer Künstler im Portrait. Ein Projekt von Lars Klostermann und Emmanuel Mir.
 Künstlergruppe FEHLSTELLE at modo Verlag

References 

German conceptual artists
Minimalist artists
German performance artists
German translators
1978 births
Living people